The Johnston Laboratories at the University of Liverpool in Liverpool, England, performed a variety of pathology and medical research during the 20th century.  They are now located in the Johnston Building. The Laboratories were founded by early University benefactor and ship owner William Johnston and formally opened on 9 May 1903.  Research activities of the Laboratories were documented in the Thompson Yates and Johnston Laboratories Report by the University of Liverpool Press.  During the 1900s and 1910s the Liverpool School of Tropical Medicine was partly housed in the laboratories.


Original facilities

Laboratory of Bio-Chemistry

Laboratories of Experimental Medicine and Cancer Research

Laboratories of Tropical Medicine

Laboratories of Comparative Pathology

Machine Room

References 

University of Liverpool
Laboratories in the United Kingdom
Biochemistry research institutes
Clinical pathology